Euclid is a visible to near-infrared space telescope currently under development by the European Space Agency (ESA) and the Euclid Consortium. The objective of the Euclid mission is to better understand dark energy and dark matter by accurately measuring the acceleration of the universe. To achieve this, the Korsch-type telescope will measure the shapes of galaxies at varying distances from Earth and investigate the relationship between distance and redshift. Dark energy is generally accepted as contributing to the increased acceleration of the expanding universe, so understanding this relationship will help to refine how physicists and astrophysicists understand it. Euclid's mission advances and complements ESA's Planck telescope (2009 to 2013). The mission is named after the ancient Greek mathematician Euclid.

Euclid is a medium-class ("M-class") mission and is part of the Cosmic Vision campaign of ESA's Science Programme. This class of missions have an ESA budget cap at around €500 million. Euclid was chosen in October 2011 together with Solar Orbiter, out of several competing missions. Prior to the Russian invasion of Ukraine, the launch was scheduled on a Soyuz ST-B in 2023; following the invasion, Euclid will instead be launched on a Falcon 9 Block 5 in July 2023.

Scientific objectives and methods
Euclid will probe the history of the expansion of the universe and the formation of cosmic structures by measuring the redshift of galaxies out to a value of 2, which is equivalent to seeing back 10 billion years in the past. The link between galactic shapes and their corresponding redshift will help to show how dark energy contributes to the increased acceleration of the universe. The methods employed exploit the phenomenon of gravitational lensing, measurement of baryon acoustic oscillations, and measurement of galactic distances by spectroscopy.

Gravitational lensing (or gravitational shear) is a consequence of the deflection of light rays caused by the presence of matter that locally modifies the curvature of space-time: light emitted by galaxies, and therefore observed images, are distorted as they pass close to matter lying along the line of sight. This matter is composed partly of visible galaxies but it is mostly dark matter. By measuring this , the amount of dark matter can be inferred, furthering the understanding of how it is distributed in the universe.

Spectroscopic measurements will permit measuring the redshifts of galaxies and determining their distances using Hubble's Law. In this way, one can reconstruct the three-dimensional distribution of galaxies in the universe.

From these data, it is possible to simultaneously measure the statistical properties concerning the distribution of dark matter and galaxies, and measure how these properties change as the spacecraft looks further back in time. Highly precise images are required to provide sufficiently accurate measurements. Any distortion inherent in the sensors must be accounted for and calibrated out, otherwise, the resultant data would be of limited use.

Spacecraft
Euclid emerged from two mission concepts that were proposed in response to the ESA Cosmic Vision 2015-2025 Call for Proposals, issued in March 2007: DUNE, the Dark Universe Explorer, and SPACE, the Spectroscopic All-Sky Cosmic Explorer. Both missions proposed complementary techniques to measure the geometry of the Universe, and after an assessment study phase, a combined mission resulted. The new mission concept was called Euclid, honouring the Greek mathematician Euclid of Alexandria (~300 BC) who is considered as the father of geometry. In October 2011, Euclid was selected by ESA's Science Programme Committee for implementation, and on 25 June 2012 it was formally adopted.

ESA selected Thales Alenia Space, Italy for the construction of the satellite. Euclid is 4.5 metres long with a diameter of 3.1 metres and a mass of 2160 kg.

The Euclid payload module is managed by Airbus Defence and Space, Toulouse, France. It consists of a Korsch telescope with a primary mirror 1.2 meter in diameter, which covers an area of 0.5 deg2.

An international consortium of scientists, the Euclid consortium, comprising scientists from 13 European countries and the United States, will provide a visible-light camera (VIS) and a near-infrared camera/spectrometer (NISP). Together, they will map the 3D distribution of up to two billion galaxies spread over more than a third of the whole sky. These large format cameras will be used to characterise the morphometric, photometric and spectroscopic properties of galaxies.

Instruments 
 VIS, a camera operating at visible wavelengths (550–920 nm) made of a mosaic of 6 × 6 e2v Charge Coupled Detectors, containing 600 million pixels, allows measurement of the deformation of galaxies
 NISP, a camera composed of a mosaic of 4 × 4 Teledyne H2RG detectors sensitive to near-infrared light radiation (1000–2000 nm) with 65 million pixels to:
 provide low precision measurements of redshifts, and thus distances, of over a billion galaxies from multi-color (3-filter (Y, J and H)) photometry (photometric redshift technique); and
 use a slitless spectrometer to analyse the spectrum of light in near-infrared (1000–2000 nm), to acquire precise redshifts and distances of millions of galaxies, with an accuracy 10 times better than photometric redshifts, and to determine the baryon acoustic oscillations.

Spacecraft bus 

The telescope bus includes solar panels that provide power and stabilises the orientation and pointing of the telescope to better than 35 milliarcseconds. The telescope is carefully insulated to ensure good thermal stability so as to not disturb the optical alignment.

The telecommunications system is capable of transferring 850 gigabits per day. It uses the Ka band and CCSDS File Delivery Protocol to send scientific data at a rate of 55 megabits per second during the allocated period of 4 hours per day to the 35-m dish Cebreros ground station in Spain, when the telescope is visible from Earth. Euclid will have an onboard storage capacity of at least 300 GB.

The service module (SVM) hosts most of the spacecraft subsystems:

 TT&C - Telemetry and Telecommand
 AOCS - Attitude Orbit Control System
 CDMS - Central Data Management System
 EPS - Electrical Power System
 RCS - Reaction Control System 
 MPS - Micro-Propulsion System

AOCS provides a stable pointing with a dispersion beneath 35 milli-arcseconds per visual exposure. A high thermal stability is required to protect the telescope assembly from optical misalignments at those accuracies.

Milestones 
NASA signed a memorandum of understanding with ESA on 24 January 2013 describing its participation in the mission. NASA will provide 20 detectors for the near-infrared band instrument, which will operate in parallel with a camera in the visible-light band. The instruments, the telescope, and the satellite will be built and operated from Europe. NASA has also appointed 40 American scientists to be part of the Euclid consortium, which will develop the instruments and analyse the data generated by the mission. Currently, this consortium brings together more than 1000 scientists from 13 European countries and the United States.

In 2015, Euclid passed a preliminary design review, having completed a large number of technical designs as well as built and tested key components.

In December 2018, Euclid passed its critical design review, which validated the overall spacecraft design and mission architecture plan, and final spacecraft assembly was allowed to commence.

In July 2020, the two instruments (visible and NIR) were delivered to Airbus, Toulouse, France for integration with the spacecraft.

After Russia withdrew (in 2022) the Soyuz planned to launch Euclid, ESA reassigned it to a SpaceX Falcon 9 launch vehicle, but still to launch in 2023.

Mission execution and data
Euclid will be launched on a Falcon 9 in July 2023. Following a travel time of 30 days, it will be stabilised to travel a Lissajous path of large amplitude (about 1 million kilometres) around the Sun-Earth Lagrangian point L2.

During its nominal mission, which will last at least six years, Euclid will observe about 15,000 deg2, about a third of the sky, focusing on the extragalactic sky (the sky facing away from the Milky Way). The survey will be complemented by additional observations about 100 times deeper (5 magnitudes) pointing toward three different fields located close to the ecliptic poles and covering 40 deg2. The three fields will be regularly visited during the whole duration of the mission. They will be used as calibration fields and to monitor the telescope and instrument performance stability as well as to produce scientific data by observing the most distant galaxies and quasars in the universe.

To measure a photometric redshift for each galaxy with sufficient accuracy, the Euclid mission depends on additional photometric data obtained in at least four visible filters. This data will be obtained from ground-based telescopes located in both northern and southern hemispheres to cover the full 15,000 deg2 of the mission. In total each galaxy of the Euclid mission will get photometric information in at least 7 different filters covering the whole range 460–2000 nm.

About 10 billion astronomical sources will be observed by Euclid, of which 1 billion will be used for weak lensing (to have their gravitational shear measured) with a precision 50 times more accurate than is possible today using ground-based telescopes. Euclid will measure spectroscopic redshifts for 50 million objects to study galaxy clustering.

The scientific exploitation of this enormous data set will be carried out by a European-led consortium of more than 1200 people in over 100 laboratories in 15 countries (Austria, Belgium, Denmark, Finland, France, Germany, Italy, the Netherlands, Norway, Portugal, Romania, Spain, Switzerland, UK, Canada, and the US). The Euclid Consortium is also responsible for the construction of the Euclid instrument payload and for the development and implementation of the Euclid ground segment which will process all data collected by the satellite. The laboratories contributing to the Euclid Consortium are funded and supported by their national space agencies, which also have the programmatic responsibilities of their national contribution, and by their national research structures (research agencies, observatories, universities). Overall, the Euclid Consortium contributes to about 30% of the total budget cost of the mission until completion.

The huge volume, diversity (space and ground, visible and near-infrared, morphometry, photometry, and spectroscopy) and the high level of precision of measurements needed demand considerable care and effort in the data processing making this a critical part of the mission. ESA, the national agencies and the Euclid Consortium are spending considerable resources to set up top-level teams of researchers and engineers in algorithm development, software development, testing and validation procedures, data archiving and data distribution infrastructures. In total, nine Science Data Centres spread over countries of the Euclid Consortium will process more than 10 petabytes of raw input images over 10 years to deliver data products (images, catalogues spectra) in 3 main public data releases in the Science Archive System of the Euclid mission to the scientific community.

With its wide sky coverage and its catalogues of billions of stars and galaxies, the scientific value of data collected by the mission goes beyond the scope of cosmology. This database will provide the worldwide astronomical community with abundant sources and targets for the James Webb Space Telescope and Atacama Large Millimeter Array, as well as future missions such as the European Extremely Large Telescope, Thirty Meter Telescope, Square Kilometer Array, and the Vera C. Rubin Observatory.

References

External links
 Euclid homepage
 Euclid article on eoPortal by ESA

European Space Agency space probes
Proposed spacecraft
Space telescopes
2023 in spaceflight
Infrared telescopes
Cosmic Vision
Dark energy
Dark matter